The Victoria is a Grade II listed public house at St John's Street, Great Harwood, Blackburn, Lancashire BB6 7EP.

It is on the Campaign for Real Ale's National Inventory of Historic Pub Interiors.

It was built in 1905.

References

Grade II listed buildings in Lancashire
Grade II listed pubs in England
National Inventory Pubs
Pubs in Lancashire
Buildings and structures in Hyndburn
Great Harwood